The Bootleg Series Vol. 6: Bob Dylan Live 1964, Concert at Philharmonic Hall is a live album by Bob Dylan, released in 2004 on Legacy Records. It is the fourth installment of the ongoing Bob Dylan Bootleg Series. The album is the complete recording from the October 31, 1964 "Halloween" show at Philharmonic Hall in Manhattan by Bob Dylan.

Concert 
The set list was dominated by Dylan's protest songs, including "The Times They Are a-Changin'," "A Hard Rain's a-Gonna Fall", and "The Lonesome Death of Hattie Carroll". Joan Baez, a major supporter of Dylan's in his early career, duets with Dylan on three songs, as well as singing another alone ("Silver Dagger", to which Dylan contributes harmonica). However, Dylan performed these songs alongside early versions of three songs from the soon-to-be-recorded Bringing It All Back Home. New compositions like "It's Alright Ma (I'm Only Bleeding)" and "Mr. Tambourine Man" showed Dylan moving in a new direction, becoming more immersed in evocative, stream-of-consciousness lyrics and moving away from social, topical songwriting. Even as he was moving in this new direction, Dylan was still portrayed as a symbol of the civil rights and anti-war movements, and the Halloween concert of 1964 caught Dylan in transition.

The album debuted on the Billboard 200 chart on April 17, 2004, at number 28 and spent four weeks on the chart. It also reached number 33 in the U.K.

Preparation

When Dylan and Sony began planning for The Bootleg Series Vol. 6, they were not sure what to release. Steve Berkowitz, an A&R head at Sony Music who worked on all the Bootleg Series discs with Dylan's office, stressed that Dylan's office, not Sony, was behind the brainstorming and decision-making for the Bootleg Series. Concerts held at Carnegie Hall and New York's Town Hall, both in 1963, were considered for The Bootleg Series Vol. 6, according to Berkowitz, but they were ultimately rejected.

The Halloween concert of 1964 had been previously bootlegged on vinyl and CD, but those releases were incomplete and taken from poor dubs of the soundboard tapes. The Bootleg Series Vol. 6 presented the entire concert for the first time from the original master tapes.

The set was well received by most critics, with NME's Rob Fitzpatrick giving it the magazine's highest rating (a 10 out of 10) and calling it "utterly brilliant".

In 2016, the set was reissued by the Audio Fidelity label as "Live 1964", on two 5.1 multi-channel SACDs.

Track listing 
All songs written by Bob Dylan, except where noted

Personnel
 Bob Dylan — vocal, guitar, harmonica
 Joan Baez — vocal on "Mama, You Been on My Mind," "Silver Dagger," "With God on Our Side," and "It Ain't Me, Babe"

Production personnel
 Tom Wilson — original recordings supervisor
 Steven Berkowitz, Jeff Rosen — producers
 Michael H. Brauer, Nat Chan — mixing engineers
 Greg Calbi — mastering engineer

References 

2004 live albums
Bob Dylan compilation albums
Bob Dylan live albums
Columbia Records live albums